is the 20th single by the Japanese girl idol group Berryz Kobo. It was released in Japan on June 3, 2009, and debuted at number 4 in the weekly Oricon singles chart.

The song "Seishun Bus Guide" was used as an ending theme for the anime series Inazuma Eleven (since April 2009).

Track listings

CD single 
 
  
 "Seishun Bus Guide" (Instrumental)
 "Rival" (Instrumental)
   
 Limited Edition A DVD
 "Seishun Bus Guide" (Close-up Ver.)

 Limited Edition B DVD
 "Rival" (Dance Shot Ver.)

DVD single "Rival" Single V 
 "Rival"
 "Rival" (Close-up Ver.)

DVD single "Seishun Bus Guide" Single V 
 "Seishun Bus Guide"
 "Seishun Bus Guide" (Dance Shot Ver.)

Charts

References

External links 
 Profile on the Up-Front Works official website

2009 singles
2009 songs
Japanese-language songs
Berryz Kobo songs
Songs written by Tsunku
Piccolo Town singles
Songs about buses